Allende is a Spanish surname meaning "on the other side". Notable people with the surname include:

Andrés Pascal Allende (b. 1943), Chilean revolutionary and nephew of Salvador Allende
Fernando Allende (b. 1952), Mexican entertainer
Ignacio Allende (1769-1811), Captain of the Spanish Army in Mexico
Ignacio Allende Fernández (b. 1969), Spanish porn actor and producer
Isabel Allende (politician) (b. 1945), Chilean politician and daughter of Salvador Allende
Isabel Allende (b. 1942), Chilean writer
Jorge Allende  (b. 1934), Chilean biologist
Laura Allende (1911–1981), Chilean politician and sister of Salvador Allende
Marcelo Allende (born 1999), Chilean footballer
Salvador Allende (1908–1973), President of Chile
Paula Frías Allende (1963-1992), daughter of the writer Isabel Allende

See also
Allende family, a political family in Chile

Basque-language surnames